From the Observatory is the title of the English-language translation of Prosa del observatorio, a book of text and photographs by Julio Cortázar originally published in Spanish in 1972. The photographs depict the observatories of Maharajah Jai Singh; the text, largely in prose but with sections in verse, ranges meditatively over a number of matters, including eels.

References

1972 poems
Postmodern books
Works by Julio Cortázar
1972 books